Mikhail Andreyevich Plotnikov (born 31 July, 1992) is a Russian professional ice hockey player. He is currently an unrestricted free agent who most recently played with HC Kunlun Red Star of the Kontinental Hockey League (KHL).

Plotnikov made his Kontinental Hockey League debut playing with HC Ugra during the 2013–14 KHL season.

References

External links

1992 births
Living people
Admiral Vladivostok players
Indiana Ice players
Krasnaya Armiya (MHL) players
HC Kunlun Red Star players
Metallurg Novokuznetsk players
Russian ice hockey forwards
HC Spartak Moscow players
HC Yugra players
Yunost Minsk players
People from Novokuznetsk
Sportspeople from Kemerovo Oblast